The 1935 New Zealand Royal Visit Honours were appointments by George V of New Zealanders to the Royal Victorian Order, to mark the visit of Prince Henry, Duke of Gloucester to New Zealand that year, and were announced on 21 January 1935. The recipients were honoured for their services in connection with the tour.

The recipients of honours are displayed here as they were styled before their new honour.

Royal Victorian Order

Knight Commander (KCVO)
 The Honourable James Alexander Young – minister in attendance.

Commander (CVO)
 Malcolm Fraser  – under-secretary for Internal Affairs.

Member, fourth class (MVO)
 Ward George Wohlmann  – Commissioner of Police.

In 1984, Members of the Royal Victorian Order, fourth class, were redesignated as Lieutenants of the Royal Victorian Order (LVO).

Member, fifth class (MVO)
 Hugh McAllister Patrick – transport officer for the royal tour.

Royal Victorian Medal (RVM)
 Inspector James Cummings – in charge of the detective force.
 Senior Sergeant John Andrew Dempsey – sergeant-in-charge of transport arrangements for the tour.
 Senior Sergeant Paris Henry Claude Boulton – of Dunedin.
 Ernest Walter Jenkins – head waiter to the Duke on the tour.

References

1935 awards
Royal Visit Honours
Monarchy in New Zealand